In French Polynesia, there are two levels of administrative divisions: five administrative subdivisions and 48 communes. Many of the communes are further subdivided into communes associées. The breakdown into administrative subdivisions was as a result of the law #71-1028, dated December 24, 1971. The compositions of the administrative subdivisions and the communes were defined in the decrees #72-408 and #72-407 of May 17, 1972, respectively. These subdivisions were confirmed in the decree #2005-1611 of December 20, 2005. Below are several lists of the divisions, according to different sorting schemes.

Administrative subdivisions

By communes

Notes

For French administrative convenience, Clipperton Island had been attached to French Polynesia until February 20, 2007, but never formed part of any administrative subdivision or commune of French Polynesia. On February 21, 2007, Clipperton Island was transferred from the High Commissioner of the republic in French Polynesia to the Minister of Overseas France.

Area statistics
The communes of French Polynesia have the following statistical info: 
The average size of French Polynesian communes is 78.06 km2, while the median area is 55.4 km2, higher than the average and median areas of metropolitan French communes (14.88 km2 and 10.73 km2, respectively), but the size of these communes is predominantly dependent on the land area of the islands they occupy.

Population statistics
The communes of French Polynesia have the following statistical info: 
The average commune population is 5,725, while the median is 2,268, much higher than the average and median metropolitan French commune (1,542 and 380, respectively).

Sources :
 https://web.archive.org/web/20060424072420/http://www.polynesie-francaise.gouv.fr/

See also
 Administrative divisions of France
 Lists of communes of France
 French Polynesia

References

Sources
Gov

French Polynesia
Administrative divisions
Administrative divisions